Karanj (also Romanized as Kāranj and Kārenj; also known as Kārbeḩ) is a village in Sardasht Rural District, Sardasht District, Dezful County, Khuzestan Province, Iran. At the 2006 census, its population was 114, in 21 families.

References 

Populated places in Dezful County